The 2019 Singapore Grand Prix (formally known as the Formula 1 Singapore Airlines Singapore Grand Prix 2019) was a Formula One motor race held on 22 September 2019 at the Marina Bay Street Circuit in Marina Bay, Singapore. The race was the 15th round of the 2019 Formula One World Championship and marked the 20th running of the Singapore Grand Prix and the 12th time the race had been held at Marina Bay.

Sebastian Vettel won the race ahead of teammate Charles Leclerc and Max Verstappen, while Kevin Magnussen set the fastest lap. This was the last race in the micro-nation until returning to the calendar in 2022, as the 2020 and 2021 races were cancelled due to the COVID-19 pandemic. It was also the last win and 1-2 finish for Ferrari until the 2022 Bahrain Grand Prix, as well as Vettel's last win of his F1 career and, as of the end of the 2022 season, the last win for a German Formula One driver.

Background

Track changes
Ahead of the race it was announced that a third DRS zone would be added between turns 13 and 14, down the Esplanade Drive, to aid overtaking. The detection point is established before turn 13.

Championship standings before the race
Entering the round Lewis Hamilton and Mercedes led the drivers and constructors championships by 63 and 154 points respectively. The size of their leads meant that both would still be leading their respective championships after the race regardless of the race's outcome.

Entries

The drivers and teams entered were the same as those for the previous race with no additional stand-in drivers for the race or practice. This race was the first occasion that Haas entered a race without title sponsor Rich Energy following the termination of the sponsorship contract.

Practice

FP1 
Charles Leclerc retired early into FP1 and Mercedes' Valtteri Bottas suffered a snap of oversteer, causing a crash at Turn 19. Thus, a red flag was brought out. Max Verstappen led the timing charts, 0.167 seconds ahead of 2nd place Sebastian Vettel during the practice session. Nico Hulkenberg set an impressive time, landing him 6th on the timing charts, albeit 1.5 seconds off of Verstappen.

FP2 
Early in the session Alexander Albon lost his front wing after locking up and bumping the wall at Turn 10. Lewis Hamilton gained an edge over Verstappen during the session, topping timing charts 0.184 seconds ahead of him. Leclerc managed to set a lap, though he was 1.245 seconds off of Hamilton. The two Ferrari drivers were reportedly frustrated after encountering numerous traffic incidents. Carlos Sainz managed P7, 1.3 seconds off of Hamilton.

Qualifying

Qualifying classification 

Notes
  – Sergio Pérez  received a five-place grid penalty for an unscheduled gearbox change.
  – Daniel Ricciardo qualified eighth, but was disqualified for exceeding the MGU-K power limit during Q1. He was allowed to race at the stewards' discretion. He also received a 10-place grid penalty for exceeding his quota for power unit components.

Race 
Daniel Ricciardo and George Russell made contact at turn one on the first lap, causing damage to Russell's front wing. Nico Hülkenberg and Carlos Sainz Jr. collided at turn five, also on lap one, with both cars suffering punctures. Russell, Hülkenberg and Sainz subsequently all made pit stops at the end of the first lap, fitting the hard-compound tyres with Russell also replacing his front wing. Sainz's mechanics encountered a problem with the rear jack during his pit stop and the car was therefore stationary for 42.4 seconds. Sainz subsequently emerged from the pits a lap down on the leaders and with aerodynamic damage caused by the punctured tyre.

For the following laps, the leaders of the race cut their pace considerably in order to conserve tyres and manage their cars' temperatures, often lapping nearly 15 seconds slower than the pole time. This had the effect of bunching up the field, and the usual gap between the front-running and midfield cars did not appear. At the end of lap 19, Sebastian Vettel and Max Verstappen became the first of the front-runners to make a pit stop, from third and fourth place respectively. Vettel emerged in tenth place, whilst Verstappen emerged in twelfth behind Hülkenberg. Charles Leclerc made his pit stop from the lead on the following lap, emerging behind his Ferrari teammate and thus handing the net lead of the race to Vettel.

Lewis Hamilton, who was yet to stop, inherited the lead of the race. Valtteri Bottas made his pit stop at the end of lap 22, emerging behind Verstappen and ahead of Alexander Albon, maintaining his net position. Hamilton was left out on ageing soft-compound tyres until the end of lap 26, in the hope that the Ferrari drivers, at the time running in sixth and seventh, would be slowed down by the midfield cars ahead. This plan did not work, and Hamilton emerged from the pits not only behind both Ferrari drivers, but also almost six seconds behind Verstappen. Hamilton did come out ahead of his teammate Bottas, who was instructed to slow down after his pit stop to ensure Hamilton would leave the pit lane ahead of him. Due to the slow pace of the lead cars in previous laps, they emerged behind the midfield cars of Antonio Giovinazzi, Pierre Gasly, Ricciardo and Lance Stroll. Vettel and Leclerc began to make their way through this group, with Vettel cementing his net lead by clearing the cars quicker than his teammate. Giovinazzi held the lead of the race for four laps until he was overtaken by Vettel on lap 31. This marked the first time a team other than Mercedes, Ferrari or Red Bull had led a race lap since Bottas led for Williams at the 2015 British Grand Prix and the first time Alfa Romeo had done so since Andrea de Cesaris led the 1983 Belgian Grand Prix.

After the front-running cars had cleared the midfield cars on lap 34, the order was Vettel, Leclerc, Verstappen, Hamilton, Bottas, Albon, Giovinazzi, Ricciardo, Hülkenberg and Lando Norris. Ricciardo attempted an overtake on Giovinazzi, with the two cars colliding. Giovinazzi was pushed off the track and lost places to Hülkenberg and Norris, whilst Ricciardo suffered a puncture causing him to drop down the order and forcing a pit stop at the end of the lap. He emerged from the pits in 18th place. On lap 34, Romain Grosjean attempted to overtake Russell around the outside of turn eight. Grosjean clipped the left rear of Russell's car, causing the Williams to swerve into the outside wall. This marked Willams' first retirement of the season and the first retirement of Russell's career. The incident brought out the safety car as the Williams was cleared from the track. Grosjean suffered a damaged front wing, making a pit stop at the end of the lap for a replacement and dropping him to 18th place. The stewards later deemed the collision a racing incident, and no action was taken.

Racing resumed on lap 41. Lance Stroll, running in 13th place, clipped the inside of the wall at turn 17, causing a puncture and front wing damage. He returned to the pits and emerged last of the running cars in 19th. On lap 43, Stroll's teammate Sergio Pérez pulled over to the side of the track from tenth place after suffering an oil leak. The safety car was brought out whilst the marshals removed Pérez's stranded car. Racing resumed again on lap 48, on lap 50 Daniil Kvyat attempted an overtake for twelfth place on the inside of Kimi Räikkönen at turn one. The cars made contact through their front wheels and the impact broke the suspension of Räikkönen's car. The incident brought out the third safety car of the race.

The safety car came in on lap 52. The final ten laps saw Charles Leclerc unsuccessfully attempt to catch his teammate Sebastian Vettel. After being overtaken by Robert Kubica and falling to last place, Kevin Magnussen took a pit stop at the end of lap 57, switching to soft-compound tyres and setting the fastest lap of the race. Since he finished the race in 17th place, Magnussen was not awarded the point for the fastest lap, which is only available if the driver finishes in the top ten. Vettel crossed the finish line to take victory, his first win since the 2018 Belgian Grand Prix. With Leclerc finishing second, this was Ferrari's first 1-2 finish since the 2017 Hungarian Grand Prix, and the first time a team has ever recorded a 1-2 finish at Singapore since the race became a Formula One World Championship event in 2008.

After the race Giovinazzi was summoned to the stewards for allegedly driving too close to the recovery crane after George Russell's crash on lap 34. Giovinazzi was given a 10-second penalty, however, since he finished 18 seconds ahead of Romain Grosjean, this did not affect his tenth-place finish.

Race classification 

Notes
  – Antonio Giovinazzi received a 10-second post-race time penalty for failing to follow the race director's instructions and causing an unsafe situation. His final position was not affected by the penalty as he had finished 18 seconds ahead of Romain Grosjean.

Championship standings after the race 

Drivers' Championship standings

Constructors' Championship standings

Note
Only the top five positions for each set of standings are shown

References

Singapore
Grand Prix
Singapore Grand Prix
Singapore Grand Prix